James Allen Whitmore Jr. (October 1, 1921 – February 6, 2009) was an American actor. He received numerous accolades, including a Golden Globe Award, a Grammy Award, a Primetime Emmy Award, a Theatre World Award, and a Tony Award, plus two Academy Award nominations.

Biography

Early life and military service 
Born in White Plains, New York, to Florence Belle (née Crane) and James Allen Whitmore Sr., a park commission official, Whitmore attended Amherst Central High School in Snyder, New York, for three years, before transferring to the Choate School in Wallingford, Connecticut, on a football scholarship. He went on to study at Yale University, but he had to quit playing football after severely injuring his knees. After giving up football, he turned to the Yale Dramatic Society and began acting. While at Yale, he was a member of Skull and Bones, and was among the founders of the Yale radio station (the student-run WOCD-AM, later renamed WYBC-AM). Whitmore planned on becoming a lawyer and graduated with a major in government from Yale University. After the outbreak of World War II, he enlisted in the United States Marine Corps Reserve in 1942 while finishing his degree, which he completed in 1944. In the Marines, he trained at Parris Island and Quantico, Virginia, and Officers Candidate School,  and was commissioned a second lieutenant. After further training he was assigned to the 4th Marine Division on Saipan in July 1944. While at Tinian, he contracted amoebic dysentery and was hospitalized. Following his hospitalization, he served guard duty at the Panama Canal Zone until his discharge in March 1946.

Marriage and later life 

After World War II, Whitmore studied acting at the American Theatre Wing and the Actors Studio in New York. At this time, Whitmore met his first wife, Nancy Mygatt. They married in 1947, and the couple had three sons before their divorce in 1971. The eldest son, James III, found success as a television actor and director under the name James Whitmore Jr. The second son, Stephen, became the public spokesman for the Los Angeles County Sheriff's Department. The youngest son, Daniel, was a Forest Service Snow Ranger and firefighter before he launched his own construction company. In 1979, Whitmore and Mygatt remarried, but they divorced again after two years.

Whitmore was married to actress Audra Lindley from 1972 until 1979. He co-starred in several stage performances with her both during and after their marriage. These included Elba (a play by Vaughn McBride about an elderly couple who escape from the nursing home); William Gibson's Handy Dandy (he as a conservative judge, she as a liberal nun); and Tom Cole's About Time (in which they played characters identified simply as the Old Man and the Old Woman).

In 2001, he married actress and author Noreen Nash. Whitmore is the grandfather of Survivor: Gabon contestant Matty Whitmore. In 2010, James Whitmore Jr.,  and his two children (grandchildren of James Whitmore), actress-director Aliah Whitmore and artist-production designer Jacob Whitmore, formed the theatre group Whitmore Eclectic. They perform in Los Angeles, California.

In his later years, Whitmore spent his summers in Peterborough, New Hampshire, performing with the Peterborough Players.

Although not always politically active, in 2007, Whitmore generated some publicity with his endorsement of Barack Obama for U.S. President. In January 2008, Whitmore appeared in television commercials for the First Freedom First campaign, which advocates preserving "the separation of church and state" and protecting religious liberty. "An avid flower and vegetable gardener, Whitmore was also known to TV viewers as the longtime commercial pitchman for Miracle-Gro garden products."

A Democrat, he supported the campaign of Adlai Stevenson during the 1952 presidential election.

Career

Film and television 
Following World War II, Whitmore appeared on Broadway in the role of the sergeant in Command Decision. Metro-Goldwyn-Mayer gave Whitmore a contract, but his role in the film adaptation was played by Van Johnson. His first major picture for MGM was Battleground, in a role that was turned down by Spencer Tracy, to whom Whitmore bore a noted physical resemblance. He was nominated for the Academy Award for Best Supporting Actor for this role, and won the Golden Globe Award as Best Performance by an Actor In A Supporting Role. Other major films included Angels in the Outfield, The Asphalt Jungle, The Next Voice You Hear, Above and Beyond, Kiss Me, Kate, Them!, Oklahoma!, Black Like Me, Guns of the Magnificent Seven, Tora! Tora! Tora!, and Give 'em Hell, Harry!, a one-man show for which Whitmore was nominated for the Academy Award for Best Actor for his portrayal of former U.S. President Harry S Truman. In the film Tora! Tora! Tora!, he played Admiral William F. "Bull" Halsey.

Whitmore appeared during the 1950s on many television anthology series. He was cast as Father Emil Kapaun in the 1955 episode "The Good Thief" in the ABC religion anthology series Crossroads. Other roles followed on Jane Wyman Presents the Fireside Theater, Lux Video Theatre, Kraft Theatre, Studio One in Hollywood, Schlitz Playhouse, Matinee Theatre, and the Ford Television Theatre. In 1958, he carried the lead in "The Gabe Carswell Story" of NBC's Wagon Train, with Ward Bond.

In the 1960–1961 television season, Whitmore starred in his own ABC crime drama, The Law and Mr. Jones, in the title role, with Conlan Carter as legal assistant C.E. Carruthers and Janet De Gore as Jones' secretary. The program ran in the 10:30 pm Eastern half-hour slot on Friday. It was cancelled after one year, but returned in April 1962 for 13 additional episodes on Thursdays.

In 1963, Whitmore played Captain William Benteen in The Twilight Zone episode "On Thursday We Leave for Home". Whitmore also appeared in Route 66 on January 18, 1963, as Ralph Vincent in “A Gift for a Warrior.” He appeared twice in Twelve O'Clock High. In 1965, Whitmore guest-starred as Col. Paul "Pappy" Hartley in Season 1, Episode 32 "The Hero" and as Col. Harry Connelly in 1966 Season 3, Episode 12 "The Ace". He also appeared in an episode of Combat! titled "The Cassock", as a German officer masquerading as a Catholic priest. In 1967, he guest-starred as a security guard in The Invaders episode, "Quantity: Unknown". That same year, Whitmore also appeared on an episode of ABC's Custer starring Wayne Maunder in the title role.

In 1968, he appeared as head of the Simian Assembly in the Planet of the Apes. In 1969, he  played the leading character of Professor Woodruff in the TV series My Friend Tony, produced by NBC. Whitmore also made several memorable appearances on the classic ABC Western The Big Valley starring Barbara Stanwyck, and the classic NBC Western The Virginian starring James Drury, during the second half of the 1960s.

From 1972 to 1973, Whitmore played Dr. Vincent Campanelli in the short-lived ABC medical sitcom Temperatures Rising.

Whitmore appeared as General Oliver O. Howard in the 1975 television film I Will Fight No More Forever, based on the 1877 conflict between the United States Army and the Nez Percé tribe, led by Chief Joseph. In 1979, Whitmore hosted a talk show of 22 episodes called simply Comeback. One of those segments focuses on the helicopter inventor Igor Sikorsky. In 1980 he starred as Borski, a therapist treating imprisoned sex-offenders, in the made-for-television movie Rage! directed by William A. Graham.  In 1980 Whitmore appeared as Jake Reeves the terminally ill father of coach Reeves in a two episode arc of the television series White Shadow.  In 1986, Whitmore voiced Mark Twain in the first claymation feature film The Adventures of Mark Twain.

In 1994, Whitmore played the role of prison librarian Brooks Hatlen in the critically acclaimed and Academy Award-nominated 1994 Frank Darabont film The Shawshank Redemption, starring Tim Robbins and Morgan Freeman; Whitmore received much praise for his poignant portrayal of Brooks, the old con and the role won him a legion of new fans. Two years later, he co-starred in the 1997 horror/sci-fi film The Relic. In 1999, he played Raymond Oz in two episodes of The Practice, earning an Emmy Award for Outstanding Guest Actor in a Drama Series.

In 2002, Whitmore played the role of the grandfather in the Disney Channel original film A Ring of Endless Light. Also in 2002, Whitmore played a supporting role in The Majestic, a film that starred Jim Carrey. In 2003, Whitmore appeared as Josh Brolin's father on the short-lived NBC drama series Mister Sterling, for which he was nominated for an Emmy Award.

In April 2007, he made his last screen appearance in a C.S.I. episode titled "Ending Happy" as Milton, an elderly man.

Theatre work 
"Whitmore often said he found acting in films and television boring because of the long waits between scenes; his passion was for the theater, and he continued to act on stage throughout his long career." Whitmore first ventured into acting at Yale University – severe knee injuries sidelined him from football, so he turned to the Yale Dramatic Society. After serving in the Marines he toured the South Pacific in a USO tour, then returned to America, where he studied acting for six months at the American Theatre Wing in New York and the Actors Studio. Afterward, he was hired by a summer stock company in Peterborough, New Hampshire – The Peterborough Players.  In 1947 he was selected to appear in a production of All My Sons, representing the U.S. at the World Youth Festival in Prague.

His first play on Broadway – Command Decision – in which Whitmore played the part of Tech Sergeant Harold Evans, was the smash hit of 1947, and Whitmore received a non-competitive Special Tony Award for "Best Newcomer of the Season". Whitmore continued to be active in the theatre for all of his career, performing on Broadway, at Ford's Theatre in Washington DC, and on tour. He later won the title "King of the One Man Show" after appearing in the solo vehicles Will Rogers' USA (1970) (repeating the role for TV in 1972); as Harry Truman in Give 'em Hell, Harry! (1975) (repeating the role in the film version, for which he was nominated for an Oscar); and as Theodore Roosevelt in Bully (1977), although the latter production did not repeat the success of the first two.

"Whitmore, who was an early student at the Actors Studio in New York in the late '40s, taught an acting workshop after moving to Hollywood. Among his students in the early '50s was young James Dean, whom Whitmore advised to go to New York. 'I owe a lot to Whitmore,' Dean told Seventeen magazine in 1955. 'One thing he said helped more than anything. He told me I didn't know the difference between acting as a soft job and acting as a difficult art.'" Whitmore often returned to New Hampshire to the Peterborough Players, where he got his start in summer stock – in 2008 he played the stage manager in Our Town. Each year the Peterborough Players award the "James Whitmore Award" to an excellent intern at the theatre.

Death 
Whitmore was diagnosed with lung cancer in November 2008. He died from the disease at the age of 87 on February 6, 2009, at his Malibu, California home.

Work

Partial filmography

1940s
The Undercover Man (1949) as George Pappas
Battleground (1949) as Kinnie

1950s
 The Outriders (1950) as Clint Priest
 Please Believe Me (1950) as Vincent Maran
 The Asphalt Jungle (1950) as Gus Minissi
 The Next Voice You Hear... (1950) as Joe Smith, American
 Mrs. O'Malley and Mr. Malone (1950) as John J. Malone
 The Red Badge of Courage (1951) as Narrator (voice, uncredited)
 Angels in the Outfield (1951) as Angel voice (voice, uncredited)
 Across the Wide Missouri (1951) as Old Bill (uncredited)
 It's a Big Country (1951) as Mr. Stacey
 Shadow in the Sky (1952) as Lou Hopke
 Because You're Mine (1952) as Sergeant 'Bat' Batterson
 Above and Beyond (1952) as Maj. William 'Bill' M. Uanna – Security Officer, Operation Silverplate
 The Girl Who Had Everything (1953) as Charles 'Chico' Menlow
 Kiss Me Kate (1953) as Slug
 All the Brothers Were Valiant (1953) as Fetcher
 The Great Diamond Robbery (1954) as Mr. Remlick, Lawyer
 The Command (1954) as Sgt. Elliott 
 Them! (1954) as Police Sgt. Ben Peterson
 Battle Cry (1955) as MSgt. Mac / Narrator
 The McConnell Story (1955) as SSgt. / Maj. / Col. Ty 'Dad' Whitman
 Oklahoma! (1955) as Mr. Carnes
 The Last Frontier (1955) as Gus
 The Eddy Duchin Story (1956) as Lou Sherwood
 Crime in the Streets (1956) as Ben Wagner
 The Young Don't Cry (1957) as Rudy Krist
 The Deep Six (1958) as Commander Warren Meredith
 The Restless Years (1958) as Ed Henderson
 Face of Fire (1959) as Monk Johnson

1960s
Who Was That Lady? (1960) as Harry Powell
’’Rawhide 1962 Incident of the Dog Faces as Sgt. Joe Duclos
Going My Way as Dr. Corden in "Tell Me When You Get to Heaven" (1963) as Dr. Corden
The Twilight Zone, "On Thursday We Leave for Home" (TV Series) (1963) as Captain  Benteen
Black Like Me (1964) as John Finley Horton
The Tenderfoot (1964), Disney's The Wonderful World of Color as Captain Ewell
Gunsmoke (1965) "The Reward" as Jim Forbes
Combat! "The Cassock" (TV Series) (1965) as Hertzbrun
The Big Valley "The Death Merchant" (1966) as Handy Random
The Big Valley "Target" (1966) as Joshua "Josh" Adam Hawks
Chuka (1967) as Lou Trent
Waterhole #3 (1967) as Capt. Shipley
The Big Valley "Night In a Small Town" (1967) as Tom Willis
The Invaders "Quantity: Unknown" (1967) as Harry Swain
Nobody's Perfect (1968) as Capt. Mike Riley
Planet of the Apes (1968) as President of the Assembly
Madigan (1968) as Chief Insp. Charles Kane
The Split (1968) as Herb Sutro
Bonanza (TV) Episode – "To Die in Darkness" (1968) as John Postley
The Big Valley "Shadow of a Giant" (1968) as Marshal Seth Campbell 
Guns of the Magnificent Seven (1969) as Levi

1970s
The Challenge (1970) (TV) as Overman
Tora! Tora! Tora! (1970) as Vice Admiral William F. Halsey
Chato's Land (1972) as Joshua Everette
The Harrad Experiment (1973) as Philip Tenhausen
High Crime (1973) as Commissioner Aldo Scavino
Where the Red Fern Grows (1974) (TV) as Grandpa
The Balloon Vendor (1974) as Antonio
I Will Fight No More Forever (1975) (TV) as General Oliver O. Howard
Give 'em Hell, Harry! (1975) as Harry S Truman
The Serpent's Egg (1977) as The Priest
The Word (TV) (1978) as George Wheeler

1980s
The First Deadly Sin (1980) as Dr. Sanford Ferguson
Rage! (1980) as [Dr] Borski
The White Shadow (1980) as Jake Reeves
Hail Columbia! (1982) narrator
The Adventures of Mark Twain (1985) as Mark Twain (voice)
Zoo Ship (1985) (voice)
All My Sons (1987) (TV) as Joe Keller
Nuts (1987) as Judge Stanley Murdoch
Glory! Glory! (1989) (TV) as Lester Babbitt

1990s
Sky High (1990) as Gus Johnson
Old Explorers (1990) as Leinen Roth
The Shawshank Redemption (1994) as Brooks Hatlen
The Relic (1997) as Dr. Albert Frock
Swing Vote (1999) as Daniel Morissey

2000s
Here's to Life! (2000) as Gus Corley
The Majestic (2001) as Stan Keller
A Ring of Endless Light (2002) as Grandfather
Fun with Dick and Jane (2005) as Toy Store Security Guard (uncredited)
CSI: Crime Scene Investigation (2007) (TV) as Milton (final appearance)

Stage
James Whitmore's theatre roles included:
 Command Decision – as Tech Sergeant Harold Evans – Fulton Theatre, New York, NY – (October 1, 1947 – September 18, 1948).
Whitmore received a 1948 Tony Award for this role. The category was "Outstanding Performance by a Newcomer".
 Winesburg, Ohio – as Tom Willard – National Theatre, New York, NY – (Feb 5 – 15, 1958).
 Inquest – as Emanuel Bloch – Music Box Theatre, New York, NY – (Apr 23 – May 16, 1970).
  Will Rogers' USA – Solo Performance as Will Rogers – Helen Hayes Theatre, New York, NY – (May 6–11, 1974).
  Give 'Em Hell, Harry! – Solo Performance as Harry Truman – Ford's Theatre, Washington, DC – (April 15 – May 4, 1975).
After the world premiere at the Ford's Theatre, the play went on to a six-city tour, during which it was videotaped for film at the Moore Theater, Seattle, Washington.See Wikipedia article on Give 'Em Hell, Harry!
 Bully – Solo Performance as Theodore Roosevelt – 46th Street Theatre, New York, NY – (November 1, 1977 – November 6, 1977).
 Almost an Eagle – as The Colonel – Longacre Theatre, New York, NY – (December 16, 1982 – December 19, 1982).
 Inherit the Wind – as Henry Drummond – Ford's Theatre, Washington, DC – (Sep 26 – November 5, 2000).

Radio
 Family Theater – episode "The Visitor" (1952)

Accolades

Whitmore has a star on the Hollywood Walk of Fame at 6611 Hollywood Boulevard. The ceremony was held on February 8, 1960.

See also
 List of people from California
 List of people from New York City
 List of Yale University people

Notes

References

External links
 
 
 
 
 Actors Master Class: James Whitmore in How To Steal A Scene
 .
 Staff (undated; copyright 2009).  "James Whitmore Obituary".  Associated Press (via the Los Angeles Times module at Legacy.com).  Retrieved October 14, 2012.
 Steven Ameche: Remembering James Whitmore At The Market

1921 births
2009 deaths
20th-century American male actors
21st-century American male actors
Male actors from California
Male actors from Connecticut
Male actors from New Hampshire
Male actors from New York City
American male film actors
United States Marine Corps reservists
United States Marine Corps personnel of World War II
American male stage actors
American male television actors
American television talk show hosts
Best Supporting Actor Golden Globe (film) winners
Choate Rosemary Hall alumni
Deaths from lung cancer in California
Donaldson Award winners
Primetime Emmy Award winners
Grammy Award winners
Male actors from Buffalo, New York
People from Malibu, California
People from Peterborough, New Hampshire
People from Wallingford, Connecticut
People from White Plains, New York
Special Tony Award recipients
Military personnel from New York (state)
United States Marines
Yale University alumni
United States Marine Corps officers
California Democrats
New York (state) Democrats
Connecticut Democrats
New Hampshire Democrats
Metro-Goldwyn-Mayer contract players
Military personnel from California
Amherst Central High School Alumni